Sayyed Nasir-ud-deen Abu Yusuf Chishti ibn Abu Nasr Muhammad Saman was an early day Sufi Saint.

He was a successor to his maternal uncle and master Abu Muḥammad Chishti, eleventh link in the Sufi silsila of the Chishti Order and the father and Master of Maudood Chishti. Abu Yusuf was a descendant of Muhammad. He died on 13 Rajab 459 AH (May 1067 CE) at the age of 84.

References

Sufi saints
People from Chisht